Shane Martin (born 11 September 1973) is an Australian cricketer. He played in two List A matches for South Australia between 1993 and 1998.

See also
 List of South Australian representative cricketers

References

External links
 

1973 births
Living people
Australian cricketers
South Australia cricketers
Cricketers from Adelaide